This is a list of petroleum, gas, and related museums around the world.

Asia
 Oman Oil and Gas Exhibition Centre, Al-Qurum
 Petroleum Museum, Malaysia
 Taiwan Oil Field Exhibition Hall, Taiwan
 KOC Ahmed Al Jaber Oil and Gas Exhibition, Kuwait
 Digboi Oil Centenary Museum, Digboi, Assam, India

Europe

 Erdöl-Erdgas-Museum Twist, Twist, Germany
 German Oil Museum, Lower Saxony, Germany
 Muzeul Național al Petrolului, Ploiesti, Romania
 Musée du pétrole de Merkwiller-Pechelbronn, Merkwiller-Pechelbronn, France
 Norwegian Petroleum Museum, Stavanger, Norway
 Engelsbergs Oljefabrik, Ängelsberg, Sweden
 Technopolis (Gazi), Athens, Greece
 GASmuseet, The Danish GAS Museum, Hobro, Denmark
 Ignacy Łukasiewicz Oil and Gas Industry Museum, Bobrka, Poland
 Warsaw Gasworks Museum, Warsaw, Poland
 Project Parco Museo del Petrolio Vallezza, Fornovo di Taro (Parma), Italy
 Fisogni Museum, Tradate (Varese), Italy (largest gas pumps and petroliana collection, certified by Guinness World Records)
 Museum of Oil Mining and geology, Hodonín, Czech republic
 Magyar Olajipari Múzeum, Zalaegerszeg, Hungary

United Kingdom
 Dukes Wood Oil Museum, Nottinghamshire
 Flame: the Gasworks Museum of Ireland (formerly Carrickfergus Gas Works Museum), Belfast
 Museum of the Scottish Shale Oil Industry, Livingston
 National Gas Museum, Leicester

North America

Canada
 Leduc #1 Energy Discovery Centre, Leduc, Alberta
 Cold Lake Museums, Cold Lake, Alberta
 Oil Museum of Canada, Oil Springs, Ontario; situated within the First Commercial Oil Fields National Historic Site of Canada

United States

California
 Antique Gas and Steam Engine Museum, Vista, California
 West Kern Oil Museum, Taft, California
 Olinda Oil Museum & Trail, Brea, California
 Hathaway Ranch Museum, Santa Fe Springs, California
 California Oil Museum, Santa Paula, California

Louisiana
 International Petroleum Museum, Morgan City, Louisiana
  Louisiana State Oil and Gas Museum, Oil City

Oklahoma
 Healdton Oil Museum, Healdton, Oklahoma
 Phillips 66 Museum, Bartlesville, Oklahoma

Pennsylvania
 Drake Well Museum, Titusville, Pennsylvania
 Pithole Museum, Pleasantville, Pennsylvania

Texas
 Central Texas Oil Patch Museum, Luling, Texas
 East Texas Oil Museum, Kilgore, Texas
 Ocean Star Offshore Drilling Rig & Museum, Galveston, Texas
 Permian Basin Petroleum Museum, Midland, Texas
 Spindletop-Gladys City Boomtown Museum, Beaumont, Texas
 Texas Energy Museum, Beaumont, Texas

Other states
 Arkansas Museum of Natural Resources, Smackover, Arkansas
  Northwoods Petroleum Museum, Three Lakes, Wisconsin
 Past Gas & Ancient Oils Museum, Sumner, Maine 
 W.H. Smith Hardware Company Building, Parkersburg, West Virginia
 General Petroleum Museum, Seattle, Washington (1980s-2003)
 Kansas Oil Museum, El Dorado, Kansas

Oceania
Dunedin Gasworks Museum, Dunedin, New Zealand
Gasworks, Brisbane, Australia

South America
 Museo Nacional del Petróleo, Comodoro Rivadavia, Chubut, Argentina
 Museo del Petróleo Samuel Schneider Uribe, Barrancabermeja, Santander, Colombia

Other
 National Gas Museum Trust, a United Kingdom charitable trust.

Former Museums
 London Gas Museum, UK, definitely closed
 General Petroleum Museum, Seattle, Washington, USA, definitely closed

References

List
List
Petro